Stan "The Man" Longinidis (born 25 June 1965) is an Australian retired heavyweight kickboxer and 8-time world kickboxing champion. Born in Melbourne of Greek ethnicity, Longinidis is one of the few fighters to win world titles in four different styles of kickboxing competition: international rules, Oriental rules, full contact and Muay Thai. He holds notable victories over Branko Cikatić, Adam Watt, Peter Graham, Musashi and Dennis Alexio.

He is also an actor and motivational speaker.

Biography

1983-1989: Early career
Stan Longinidis began practicing martial arts in 1982 after being inspired by watching a martial artist defeat five opponents in a night club brawl. His kickboxing career commenced in 1983, and he had won two amateur titles when he challenged Santiago Garza for the WKA World Light Heavyweight Championship in 1987. Despite the contest ending in a draw, Longinidis had displayed such potential that he was invited to train full-time at the prestigious Jet Center kickboxing gym of Van Nuys. Determined to become Australia's first world champion in the sport, Longinidis resigned from his job as a computer programmer and moved to the United States. From his new home in California, he amassed 18 consecutive wins and won the WKA North American and US Heavyweight Championships, as well as the Australian National Heavyweight title.

1990-1992: Heyday as world champion
In April 1990, Longinidis achieved his dream of becoming the first Australian to win a world kickboxing title when he claimed the KICK World Super Heavyweight Championship in a match against the legendary Anthony Elmore. The following year, he challenged the long-reigning WKA World Heavyweight Champion Maurice Smith for his title. Despite knocking the American down in the opening round, Longinidis eventually lost a battle of attrition and accepted a split decision defeat - his first professional loss. Undeterred, he soon acquired the WKA World Junior Heavyweight (Cruiserweight) and Super Heavyweight Championships, the latter coming by way of a record-setting 15-second knockout of Melvin Cole in Queensland.

In 1992, he notably defended his titles against top heavyweights Branko Cikatić and Grant Barker. He fought a full 12 rounds against Cikatić before winning by unanimous decision, and knocked out Barker with low kicks. He followed this up with additional wins over international powerhouses Mitch O'Hello and Adam Watt.

On 6 December 1992, Longinidis competed in one of the biggest and most controversial matches in history, against kickboxing superstar Dennis Alexio. Fueled by media hype and personal animosity between the two fighters, it was one of the most highly-anticipated martial arts events when Longinidis and Alexio finally met in Melbourne to compete for the vacant ISKA World Oriental Rules Heavyweight Championship. The match lasted just 15 seconds, with Alexio falling to the mat after receiving a low kick from his opponent. Longinidis was declared the winner by KO and became the new champion.

Controversy arose when Alexio claimed to have broken his leg by stepping into a hole in the canvas, and thus the match's outcome was placed under review. The US branch of the ISKA overturned their ruling and changed it to a no contest, while the ISKA's Australian body and the WKA (which also sanctioned the match) upheld their original decision. A rematch between Longinidis and Alexio never took place.

1993-2003: K-1 and later career
Longinidis continued to defend his titles, also adding the ISKA World Heavyweight Championship to his collection in 1993 and the WAKO PRO World Super Heavyweight Championship 1994. He began competing for the K-1 kickboxing promotion in March 1993, becoming one of the first major fighters to be signed by the company. After defeating reigning Karate World Cup champion Toshiyuki Atokawa in K-1's first event, Longinidis fought rising star Masaaki Satake in a title-versus-title affair, with Satake wagering his UKF World Super Heavyweight Championship and Longinidis his WKA World Super Heavyweight Championship. Longinidis lost by unanimous decision but retained his title after asserting that the match had not taken place under WKA rules.

Significant victories and setbacks marked Longinidis' career thereafter. He won the TAIPAN 1 tournament of 1994 by defeating three opponents in a single night, but lost his WKA, ISKA, and WAKO PRO World Super Heavyweight titles in a single match to Jeff Roufus in 1995. He qualified twice for the K-1 World Grand Prix, but was knocked out by Mike Bernardo in the 1995 quarterfinals and was unable to compete in the 1996 tournament due to injury. In June 1996, Longinidis won the inaugural WMTC World Super Heavyweight Muay Thai Championship in Pattaya was personally presented the title by King Rama IX. He lost the championship in September of the same year to Andy Hug. A serious knee injury threatened to end his career around this time and contributed to several losses, but Longinidis underwent complete reconstructive surgery in 1997.

Longinidis fought until 2000, when he retired after defeating fellow Australian Peter Graham at K-1 Oceania Star Wars 2000. He returned to the ring shortly afterwards for another several bouts before retiring for good in 2003. He ended his career with a record of 88 wins (65 KOs), 9 losses and 5 draws with one no contest.

2004-present: Life after competition and accolades
Longinidis was awarded a lifetime achievement award at a France martial arts expo in 2000. The commendation recognized his significant impact on kickboxing and his status as one of the most famous names in the history of the sport. On 10 October 2013, he became the first martial artist to be inducted in the Australian Sports Hall of Fame.

Never far removed from the sport that made him famous, Longinidis trained his younger brother George Longinidis en route to winning the WOKA World Heavyweight Championship in 2009. He also managed kickboxing superstar Mike Zambidis.

Longinidis now works as a motivational speaker.

Titles and accomplishments
World Kickboxing Federation
 1998 WKBF World Heavyweight Champion
World Muaythai Council
 1996 WMC World Super Heavyweight Champion
World Association of Kickboxing Organizations
 1994 WAKO PRO World Super Heavyweight Champion
International Sport Karate Association
 1993 ISKA World Heavyweight Champion (Freestyle Rules)
 1992 ISKA World Heavyweight Champion (Oriental Rules)
World Kickboxing Association
 1992 WKA World Super Heavyweight Champion
 1991 WKA World Cruiserweight Champion
 1989 WKA United States Heavyweight Champion
 1988 WKA North American Heavyweight Champion
 1984 WKA Amateur Australian Heavyweight Champion
Karate International Council of Kickboxing
 1990 KICK World Super Heavyweight Champion
 1988 KICK North American Heavyweight Champion
Other
 1994 Taipan 1 World Heavyweight Champion
 1990 Australian National Heavyweight Kickboxing Champion
 1989 Intercontinental Heavyweight Kickboxing Champion

Kickboxing record

|-  style="background:#fbb;"
| 2003-02-17 || Loss ||align=left| Gurkan Ozkan || K-1 No Respect 2003 || Melbourne, Australia || TKO (Corner stoppage) || 9 || 
|-
|-  style="background:#c5d2ea;"
| 2001-12-16 || NC ||align=left| Ryuji Murakami || The Kakidamishi 2 || Okinawa, Japan || No contest || 5 || 3:00
|-
! style=background:white colspan=9 |
|-  style="background:#cfc;"
| 2000-11-29 || Win ||align=left| Peter Graham || K-1 Oceania Star Wars 2000 || Melbourne, Australia || Decision (Unanimous) || 10 || 2:00
|-  style="background:#cfc;"
| 2000-09-03 || Win ||align=left| Hannes van der Berg || K-1 Africa Grand Prix 2000 || Cape Town, South Africa || KO || 1 ||
|-  style="background:#fbb;"
| 2000-07-30 || Loss ||align=left| Taiei Kin || K-1 World Grand Prix 2000 in Nagoya || Nagoya, Aichi, Japan || Majority decision (0-2) || 3 || 3:00
|-  style="background:#cfc;"
| 2000-05-12 || Win ||align=left| Jokki Oberholtzer || K-1 King of the Ring 2000 || Bologna, Italy || TKO || 1 || 1:55
|-  style="background:#c5d2ea;"
| 2000-03-19 || Draw ||align=left| Tsuyoshi Nakasako || K-1 Burning 2000 || Tokyo, Japan || Decision (1-0) || 5 || 3:00
|-  style="background:#fbb;"
| 1999-05-14 || Loss ||align=left| Rick Roufus || IKF Mass Destruction || Lowell, USA || TKO || 9 ||
|-
! style=background:white colspan=9 |
|-  style="background:#cfc;"
| 1998-10-28 || Win ||align=left| Tsuyoshi Nakasako || K-1 Japan '98 Kamikaze || Tokyo, Japan || TKO (Nose broken) || 4 ||
|-  style="background:#fbb;"
| 1997-07-20 || Loss ||align=left| Duane van der Merwe || K-1 Dream '97 || Nagoya, Japan || Decision (Majority) || 5 || 3:00
|-  style="background:#cfc;"
| 1997-06-08 || Win ||align=left| Grant Barker || Now Or Never || Sydney, Australia ||  KO (Left high kick) || 2 || 1:00
|-
! style=background:white colspan=9 |
|-  style="background:#cfc;"
| 1997-04-29 || Win ||align=left| Takeru || K-1 Braves '97 || Fukuoka, Japan || Decision (Unanimous) || 5 || 3:00
|-  style="background:#c5d2ea;"
| 1996-12-08 || Draw ||align=left| Mike Bernardo || K-1 Hercules '96 || Nagoya, Japan || Draw || 5 || 3:00
|-  style="background:#cfc;"
| 1996-10-18 || Win ||align=left| Masaaki Miyamoto || K-1 Star Wars '96 || Yokohama, Japan || TKO (Corner stoppage) || 3 || 2:55
|-  style="background:#fbb;"
| 1996-09-01 || Loss ||align=left| Andy Hug || K-1 Revenge '96 || Osaka, Japan || KO (Left straight) || 2 || 2:00
|-
! style=background:white colspan=9 |
|-  style="background:#cfc;"
| 1996-03-30 || Win ||align=left| Kirkwood Walker || WMC King's 50th Anniversary || Pattaya, Thailand || Decision (Unanimous) || 5 || 3:00
|-
! style=background:white colspan=9 |
|-  style="background:#cfc;"
| 1996-03-10 || Win ||align=left| Sadau Kiatsongrit || K-1 Grand Prix '96 Opening Battle || Yokohama, Japan || Ext.R Decision (Unanimous) || 6 || 3:00
|-
! style=background:white colspan=9|
|-  style="background:#cfc;"
| 1995-12-09 || Win ||align=left| Musashi || K-1 Hercules || Nagoya, Japan || Decision (Unanimous) || 5 || 3:00
|-  style="background:#fbb;"
| 1995-10-22 || Loss ||align=left| Sam Greco || The Best of the Best - Final || Australia || Decision (Unanimous) || 3 || 3:00
|-
! style=background:white colspan=9 |
|-  style="background:#cfc;"
| 1995-10-22 || Win ||align=left| Mitch O'Hello || The Best of the Best - Semifinal || Australia ||  || ||
|-  style="background:#cfc;"
| 1995-10-22 || Win ||align=left| Nathan Briggs || The Best of the Best - Quarterfinal || Australia ||  || ||
|-  style="background:#cfc;"
| 1995-09-03 || Win ||align=left| Nobuaki Kakuda || K-1 Revenge II || Yokohama, Japan || KO (Right low kick) || 2 || 3:05
|-  style="background:#fbb;"
| 1995-05-04 || Loss ||align=left| Mike Bernardo || K-1 Grand Prix '95 Quarter Finals || Tokyo, Japan || KO (Right high kick) || 3 || 1:42
|-  style="background:#fbb;"
| 1995-03-25 || Loss ||align=left| Jeff Roufus || World Cup of Martial arts || Ledyard, United States || KO (Overhand right) || 1 || 0:41
|-
! style=background:white colspan=9 |
|-  style="background:#cfc;"
| 1995-03-03 || Win ||align=left| Patrick Smith || K-1 Grand Prix '95 Opening Battle || Tokyo, Japan || KO (Right low kick) || 2 || 2:59
|-
! style=background:white colspan=9|
|-  style="background:#cfc;"
| 1994-09-18 || Win||align=left| Branko Cikatić || K-1 Revenge || Yokohama, Japan || Decision (Unanimous) || 5 || 3:00
|-  style="background:#cfc;"
| 1994-03-06 || Win ||align=left| Vladimir Golovinsky || Taipan 1: The Best of the Best - Final || Australia || KO || 1 ||
|-
! style=background:white colspan=9 |
|-  style="background:#cfc;"
| 1994-03-06 || Win ||align=left| Dino Homsey || Taipan 1: The Best of the Best - Semifinal || Australia || KO || 1 ||
|-  style="background:#cfc;"
| 1994-03-06 || Win ||align=left| Bob Schrijber || Taipan 1: The Best of the Best - Quarterfinal || Australia || Decision (Unanimous) || 3 || 3:00
|-  style="background:#fbb;"
| 1993-09-04 || Loss ||align=left| Masaaki Satake || K-1 Illusion || Tokyo, Japan || Decision (Unanimous) || 5 || 3:00
|-
! style=background:white colspan=9 |
|-  style="background:#cfc;"
| 1993-07-25 || Win ||align=left| Gary Sandland || WKA Battle of Champions || Australia || KO (Right straight) || 3 ||
|-
! style=background:white colspan=9 |
|-  style="background:#cfc;"
| 1993-03-30 || Win ||align=left| Toshiyuki Atokawa || K-1 Sanctuary I || Tokyo, Japan || TKO (Referee stoppage) || 5 || 2:22
|-  style="background:#cfc;"
| 1992-12-06 || Win ||align=left| Dennis Alexio || ISKA-WKA Alexio vs. Longinidis || Melbourne Australia || KO (Left low kick) || 1 || 0:15
|-
! style=background:white colspan=9 |
|-
|-  style="background:#cfc;"
| 1992-10-04 || Win ||align=left| Adam Watt || Seidokaikan '92 Karate World Cup - Kakutogi Olympic III || Osaka, Japan || TKO (Dislocated shoulder) ||  ||
|-  style="background:#cfc;"
| 1992-06 || Win ||align=left| Branko Cikatić ||  || Melbourne, Australia || Decision (Unanimous) || 12 ||
|-
! style=background:white colspan=9 |
|-  style="background:#cfc;"
|-  style="background:#cfc;"
| 1992 || Win ||align=left| Mitch O'Hello ||  || Australia || KO (Low kick) || 1 ||
|-  style="background:#cfc;"
| 1992 || Win ||align=left| Grant Barker ||  || Australia || KO (Left low kicks) || 4 ||
|-
! style=background:white colspan=9 |
|-  style="background:#cfc;"
| 1992 || Win ||align=left| Lawrence White ||  || Australia || KO || 7 ||
|-
! style=background:white colspan=9 |
|-  style="background:#cfc;"
| 1992 || Loss ||align=left| Melvin Cole ||  || Queensland, Australia || KO || 1 || 0:15
|-
! style=background:white colspan=9 |
|-  style="background:#fbb;"
| 1991 || Loss ||align=left| Maurice Smith ||  || Sydney, Australia || Decision (Split) || 12 || 2:00
|-
! style=background:white colspan=9 |
|-  style="background:#cfc;"
| 1990-04 || Win ||align=left| Anthony Elmore || KICK Kickboxing || Sydney, Australia] ||  Decision (Split) || 12 ||
|-
! style=background:white colspan=9 |
|-  style="background:#cfc;"
| 1990 || Win ||align=left| Dale Broussard || || Las Vegas, USA || KO (Right hook) || 1 ||
|-
! style=background:white colspan=9 |
|-  style="background:#cfc;"
| 1989-12-04 || Win ||align=left| Charles Archie || WKA Kickboxing || Melbourne, Australia || KO (Right hook) || 1 ||
|-
! style=background:white colspan=9 |
|-  style="background:#cfc;"
| 1988-03 || Win ||align=left| Brendon Leddy || WKA Kickboxing || Los Angeles, USA || KO || 3 ||
|-
! style=background:white colspan=9 |
|-  style="background:#cfc;"
| 1988 || Win ||align=left| Kenneth Penn || KICK Kickboxing || United States || TKO (Corner stoppage) || 1 ||
|-
! style=background:white colspan=9 |
|-  style="background:#c5d2ea;"
| 1987 || Draw ||align=left| Santiago Garza || WKA Kickboxing || Perth, Australia || Draw || 12 || 2:00
|-
! style=background:white colspan=9 |
|-
| colspan=9 | Legend:

Filmography

Film

See also
List of K-1 events
List of K-1 champions
List of male kickboxers

References

Notes

External links
Official website
IMDb page

1965 births
Australian male kickboxers
Heavyweight kickboxers
Living people
Sportspeople from Melbourne
Australian people of Greek descent
Australian Muay Thai practitioners
Sport Australia Hall of Fame inductees